Flora is a city in Clay County, Illinois, United States. The population was 4,803 at the 2020 census.

History
Flora was founded by Samuel White. White was born September 10, 1831 in Warren County, Ohio.  He and his family came to Clay County in 1852. During that time, he purchased  of land from the State of Illinois.  His first wife, Sarah Ann Wall was born in 1833.  Sarah died December 13, 1859 in Flora, and is buried in the family plot in Elmwood Cemetery. In December 1860, White married Helen M. Riggs in  Flora.

The original town of Flora was laid out, surveyed and platted in February 1854 by Ethelred Nixon, County Surveyor; John Brown, Trustee for Songer, Camp & Company; and Samuel White.  It embraced eighty-five acres of the west half of Section 25, Township 3 north Range 6 east.  Samuel White who still owned the land, deeded one-half interest in forty acres to John Brown, Trustee, with a view of securing the town and depot. An effort had already been made to establish a town one mile west called Mooresville, where over 100 lots had been sold and some buildings done. After the collapse of that village, the principal house was moved to Flora, and was then known as the "Commercial House."

Samuel White also donated land to the City of Flora for several buildings and the city park. The City Park, at that time called the Public Square, is present day Library Park where Flora Public Library is located.  White donated land for the 1st schoolhouse, the Baptist Church and parsonage. Land was also donated for streets and alleys of the original town of Flora.  The city's founder died November 15, 1912 in Sterling, Colorado and was returned to Flora for burial in the family plot at Elmwood.

From "Flora, Illinois - Founded 1854" compiled by Flora Resident, Jeanie Briscoe.
The book also contains historic information about the B & O railroad, the history of various buildings, and obituaries of some of Flora's early citizens.

Geography
Flora is located at  (38.6698, -88.4841).

Climate

Demographics

As of the 2020 census there were 4,803 people, 1,984 households, and 1,115 families residing in the city. The racial makeup of the city was 92.30% White, 0.46% African American, 0.44% Native American, 1.23% Asian, 1.12% from other races, and 4.46% from two or more races. Hispanic or Latino of any race were 2.42% of the population.

There were 1,984 households, out of which 44.91% had children under the age of 18 living with them, 40.73% were married couples living together, 8.62% had a female householder with no husband present, and 43.80% were non-families. 32.21% of all households were made up of individuals, and 16.33% had someone living alone who was 65 years of age or older. The average household size was 2.82 and the average family size was 2.26.

The city's age distribution consisted of 20.6% under the age of 18, 9.9% from 18 to 24, 22.6% from 25 to 44, 27.8% from 45 to 64, and 19.1% who were 65 years of age or older. The median age was 41.7 years. For every 100 females, there were 80.5 males. For every 100 females age 18 and over, there were 79.2 males.

The median income for a household in the city was $49,722, and the median income for a family was $60,660. Males had a median income of $43,538 versus $27,326 for females. The per capita income for the city was $27,726. About 11.5% of families and 17.0% of the population were below the poverty line, including 16.0% of those under age 18 and 9.0% of those age 65 or over.

Economy 
In September 1960, Flora was named "Ford Town USA" and some 1500 vehicle owners were supplied with a new Ford car or truck to drive during that week.

Flora's main industry is agriculture, although there are companies located in Flora that employ several hundreds. Flora is surrounded by a gently rolling countryside, with approximately 80-85% of it dedicated to farming and livestock.

The Flora B&O Depot

 
The Flora B&O Depot was built in 1872 with generous help from local citizens.  It served the City of Flora until 1916, when it was destroyed by fire.

In 1916–1917, a new three-story brick depot was built. This building was a huge part of the economic life of the community during those early years. In the 1920s, the railroad employed half the wage earners in Flora. In 1924, three hundred employees worked at the local station.

When the depot was completed in 1917, it contained three floors. The main floor was used for passengers. It had a large waiting room with a baggage room and restrooms. The Western Union office, yard office, mailroom and ticket office were also located on this floor.

The second floor held the offices of important depot members. Men who occupied these offices included the chief clerk, division engineer, superintendents, dispatchers, carpenters, signal supervisors, train masters and road foremen, plus railroad law enforcement officers and the district's own physician.

The third floor contained large offices. Later, these offices became one social room. It was here that railroad employees and their families held potluck dinners and socials. Not only was the depot a hub of transportation and commerce, it was a center for much of the social life in the community.

In the 1950s, as roads improved, cars became the chief means of transportation. Travelers no longer looked to trains as the primary source of transportation. The depot became less important to the community and the days of hosting 12 passenger trains, daily passing through Flora, became a fond memory.

In 1998, the Flora B&O Depot was named one of three sites in Clay County on the National Register of Historic Places. With this recognition and the interest of many citizens of the community, the Flora Community Development Corporation (FCDC) purchased the depot from CSX Railroad.

FCDC successfully obtained three federal grants to restore the building, matched by local donations of citizens. Today, the University of Illinois Extension Service rents the third floor. The second floor is a community room available to rent for various activities. The first floor houses the Flora Chamber of Commerce office, a museum containing city and county historical artifacts and two unfinished room available for occupancy.

More history, rent/leasing information, and events can be found on their website.

'Is We Is'
In 1987 a group of Flora officials formed the so-called "Barbed Wire Choir" and recorded a music video in an attempt to land a state prison. The song featured several city officials, including the mayor, asking then-Gov. Jim Thompson "Is we is or is we isn't/gonna get ourselves a prison." After being shown on local TV stations, the video gained the attention of national programs such as MTV, Good Morning America and The Late Show Starring Joan Rivers.  Flora ultimately lost its bid to host the new prison.

Notable people
 Tim Tetrick, harness racing driver
 Mad Man Pondo, pro wrestler
 John Powless, basketball and tennis coach at University of Wisconsin, high school and college tennis champion
 Bill Ernest, President and Managing Director, Asia, for Walt Disney Parks & Resorts
 Emily Bailey, contestant on the Road Rules: USA – The Second Adventure reality TV show

References

External links
Flora Homepage - http://www.florail.us
Flora Public Library - http://www.florapubliclibrary.org/
Flora Police - http://www.florapolice.com
Flora-Clay County ESDA http://www.flora-claycountyesda.com/
City of Flora tourism videos- http://www.elocallink.tv/vp2/vp6_brain.php?loc=/vp2/vp3_show.php&qstring=cid%3D424
Flora Schools http://www.floraschools.com
WNOI 103.9 Radio http://www.wnoi.com/
Flora Newspaper http://www.advocatepress.com/
Clay County Health Department http://www.healthdept.org
Clay County Hospital  http://www.claycountyhospital.org

Cities in Illinois
Cities in Clay County, Illinois
1854 establishments in Illinois
Populated places established in 1854